The Briars is a former homestead in Mount Martha, Victoria, Australia, now managed by the Mornington Peninsula Shire as a conservation park. Partially used for wine production, it was then handed down through generations of the same family until in 1976, the property was transferred to the National Trust of Australia and the Shire.

The site now consists of the homestead, gardens, a wildlife sanctuary, a public nursery, a public park and other private facilities such as an outdoor education camp.

History 
Alexander Balcombe was born at a property known as The Briars on the island of St Helena in 1811. In 1815, it served as the temporary home of the exiled Napoleon Bonaparte. His father, William, became the first Treasurer of the Colony of New South Wales in April 1824, purchasing a 4000 acre property by the Molonglo River, before dying in 1829. Alexander's brother, William, then acquired an adjacent property which he also named The Briars and worked with Alexander, before dying in the goldfields in 1852.

Alexander's nephew, William Alexander (son of Thomas), later moved to Wahroonga, Sydney, and also named his house there The Briars.

In 1846, Alexander took livestock south with wife Emma, taking over the Tichingorouk run that had been established four years earlier,  and renaming it The Briars. After a stint at the goldfields in the 1850s, he became a magistrate. They progressively built and expanded the homestead from the 1850s to the 1870s.

After Alexander died in 1877, the property passed to Emma, and then onto their eldest daughter Jane Emma in 1907. In 1954, it passed to her three granddaughters, Mary, Elizabeth and Anne. Marry and Elizabeth bought out Anne's share. Mary subsequently sold her share, the southern half, in 1972.

In 1976, Elizabeth's sons, Richard, Tony and Michael, gave the 8 hectare homestead and garden site jointly to the Shire and the National Trust, and sold the northern section (225 hectares) to the Shire. Its first public open day was in 1977.

A wetlands was established in 1985, and an outdoor education camp and public nursery in 1997. An "Eco-Living Display Centre" followed in 2009.

See also 
 Briars, Saint Helena
 The Briars, Wahroonga

References 

Homesteads in Victoria
Buildings and structures in the Shire of Mornington Peninsula
Houses completed in 1840
1840 establishments in Australia